Communities Without Boundaries International (CWBI) is an international non-governmental organization carrying out peacebuilding and sustainable development projects, founded on the philosophy and principles of nonviolence as espoused by Martin Luther King Jr. and Mohandas K. Gandhi. 

CWBI implements its programs with a theory of change seeking to empower individuals and communities. Youth Without Boundaries (YWB) initiative brings together youth (ages 18–35) from around the world to travel and experience other cultures, lifestyles, and challenges their peers around the world face.

In 2013, CWBI joined an alliance of other organizations advocating in issues from labor, civil rights and human rights, education, media, and housing, to march on Washington since Martin Luther King Jr.'s historic 1963 March on Washington.

References

Peace organizations based in the United States